Sebrus amandus is a moth in the family Crambidae. It was described by Stanisław Błeszyński in 1970. It is found in Perinet, Madagascar.

This species has a forewing length of 7–8 mm, with a dull whitish ground colour, dusted with brown scales. The types were provided from Perinet, Madagascar. It can be distinguished from Pediasia by the double frenulum in the female (single in Pediasia species).

References

Related pages
List of moths of Madagascar

Crambinae
Moths described in 1970